Gämi is a village and suburb on the southeastern outskirts of Ashgabat, Turkmenistan, approximately 5 kilometres from the city centre. It is located in Ak bugdaý District in Ahal Province and lies on the M37 highway which connects Ashgabat to Annau.

The local economy is based around cotton, wheat and vegetable production. The state policy provides tax-free land and water, fertilizers and agricultural equipment services at privileged prices to farmers in the village.

References

External links
United States Mission visit to the village

Populated places in Ahal Region
Ashgabat